State Highway 53 (SH 53) is a Texas state highway that runs from Temple to Rosebud.

History

SH 53 was designated on August 21, 1923 as a route from Dickens to Brownfield, replacing a portion of SH 18. This route was cancelled on March 19, 1930 when SH 24 extended west, replacing the route from Dickens to Lubbock, while the rest of the route was renumbered as part of SH 137.

SH 53 was designated again on March 19, 1930 replacing SH 108A from Lampasas to Temple. On May 20, 1930, it extended east to Rosebud. It was shortened to its current route on September 26, 1939, when the stretch from Lampasas to Temple was transferred to U.S. Route 190 (which this section was cosigned with since 1935). On January 24, 1978, SH 53 was rerouted over part of SH 36 to SH 36.

Major intersections

References

External links

053
Transportation in Bell County, Texas
Transportation in Falls County, Texas